The Welch Regiment War Memorial, also known as the Maindy Monument is a First World War memorial at Maindy Barracks in the Cathays area of Cardiff in Wales. The memorial was designed by Sir Edwin Lutyens and follows his design for the Cenotaph on Whitehall in London. Unveiled in 1924, it commemorates men of the Welch Regiment who fell in the First World War, and is today a grade II listed building.

Background
In the aftermath of the First World War and its unprecedented casualties, thousands of war memorials were built across Britain. Amongst the most prominent designers of memorials was the architect Sir Edwin Lutyens, described by Historic England as "the leading English architect of his generation". Lutyens designed the Cenotaph on Whitehall in London, which became the focus for the national Remembrance Sunday commemorations, as well as the Thiepval Memorial to the Missing—the largest British war memorial anywhere in the world—and the Stone of Remembrance which appears in all large Commonwealth War Graves Commission cemeteries and in several of Lutyens' civic war memorials. The Welch Regiment is one of eight cenotaphs by Lutyens in Britain besides the one on Whitehall, one of three to serve as a memorial for a regiment (the other two being the Royal Berkshire Regiment War Memorial in Reading and the Queen's Own Royal West Kent Regiment Cenotaph in Maidstone), and the only one of his war memorials in Wales (the other eight are all in England).

The squat design of the cenotaph is reminiscent of several memorials for individuals designed by Lutyens, including American actor James Keteltas Hackett and Australian businessman Sidney Myer.

The Welch Regiment originally commissioned Lutyens to design a memorial to be sited near Gheluvelt on the Western Front in Belgium, where the regiment had been involved in fighting. The principle was approved by the Battlefield Exploits Committee in October 1922, but six months later Lutyens wrote to the War Office to inform them that the memorial would instead be erected outside Maindy Barracks, the regiment's headquarters, in Cardiff.

History and design
The memorial consists of a cenotaph in Portland stone which stands on a stepped plinth and a square base, all standing on a base of three shallow steps. Then north and south faces bear inscriptions in English and Welsh (respectively), while the east and west faces contain the regiment's role of honour from the First and Second World Wars (respectively). Inscriptions relating to the Second World War and the Korean War (1950–1953) were added later. The upper sections of the east and west faces bear carvings of a laurel wreath in high relief, while regimental cap badges are carved on the lower stages of each face.

The memorial was unveiled on 11 November 1924 by Major-General Sir Thomas Marden, with the dedication carried out by the Reverend Ernest Thorold.

Notes

References

Welch Regiment
Grade II listed monuments and memorials in Wales
Grade II listed buildings in Cardiff
War memorials in Cardiff
World War I memorials in Wales
World War II memorials in the United Kingdom
Military history of Wales
Works of Edwin Lutyens in Wales
War memorials by Edwin Lutyens
Buildings and structures completed in 1924